Martial Kingdoms is a 2003 Taiwanese single-player strategy video game developed by T-Time Technology. The plot is based on wuxia novels and set in the wulin (martial artists' community) of 16th-century China. It has a sequel, Martial Kingdoms 2, which was released in 2007.

Gameplay
The player chooses one from 13 martial arts organisations to play as, and must conquer the others to rule the wulin (martial artists' community) and win the game. At the start of the game, each organisation controls at least one base out of 20, all located on a map of China. An organisation is conquered when it loses all its bases or when its leader is killed.

There are different ways for an organisation to increase its strength and power:
 Recruiting and training new members
 Taking control of unoccupied bases or conquering bases controlled by other organisations, so as to acquire more resources such as gold, wood and iron ore.
 Upgrading its factories to produce weapons, equipment and medicine of better quality
 Discovering and learning more powerful skills through studying and gaining experience from battles
 Forming alliances with other organisations
 Attracting special characters (seven in total) to join the organisation

The player can manage members and arrange their daily schedules to determine how much time each member spends on a certain task (e.g. collecting resources, making items, training) and what skill the member will be learning.

Plot
The game is set in 16th-century China during the reign of the Jiajing Emperor of the Ming dynasty. Deceived by the corrupt chancellor Yan Song, the emperor fears that the martial artists' community will pose a threat to him. He sends the secret police to stir up conflict among the various organisations in the hope that they will destroy each other.

There are four storylines that the player can choose from. In each storyline, the number of bases occupied by each organisation at the beginning is different and some organisations appear only in certain storylines. The player also has the option to create and play as a new organisation.

The 20 bases are:

 Qilian Mountains
 Mount Hua
 Mount Heng
 Shuntian Prefecture
 Changbai Mountains
 Mount Tai
 Mount Song
 Wudang Mountains
 Yingtian Prefecture
 Mount Emei
 Wu Mountains
 Dongting Lake
 Huangshan
 Tiantai Mountain
 Wuyi Mountains
 Lingnan
 Liuzhou
 Jiaozhou
 Dian Lake
 Guizhou

The 12 default organisations featured in the game are:

 Demonic Cult
 Beggars' Gang
 Shaolin Monastery
 Wudang School
 Emei School,
 Mount Hua School
 Mount Wu School
 Dongting Gang
 Taiyi Sect
 Baoxiang Monastery
 Heroes School
 Shennong Gang

See also
 List of organisations in wuxia fiction
 Xuanyuan Jian
 The Legend of Sword and Fairy
 Jade Empire
 Bujingai
 Heavenly Sword
 Heroes of Jin Yong
 Dragon Oath

References

External links
  Martial Kingdoms official website

2003 video games
Video games set in the Ming dynasty
Video games set in the 16th century
Chinese-language-only video games
Video games developed in Taiwan
Windows games
Windows-only games
Wuxia video games
Single-player video games